The Teatro Comunale Giuseppe Borgatti (Communal Theatre of Giuseppe Borgatti) is a 19th-century theatre and music performance hall located on Via Campagnoli Bartolomeo in Cento, Province of Ferrara, Region of Emilia-Romagna, Italy. The theater is named after the prominent tenor from Cento, Giuseppe Borgatti (1871–1950).

The theatre was built between 1856 and 1861 using designs by Antonio Giordani and Fortunato Lodi. The colourful exterior has a Neo-Romanesque style with rounded arches. The interiors were frescoed during the 19th century. Structural damage from the  2012 Northern Italy earthquakes led to closure of the theater, until restorations completed. The museum display dedicated to Borgatti and the flutist  remain open.

References

Opera houses in Italy
Buildings and structures in Emilia-Romagna
Performing arts venues in Emilia-Romagna
Theatres completed in 1861
Theatres in Emilia-Romagna
Music venues completed in 1861
1861 establishments in Italy
19th-century architecture in Italy